Leonard Keith Johnson (28 March 1929 – 24 September 1995) was an Australian politician. Born in Melbourne, he was educated at public schools before becoming a factory worker and storeman. An organiser of the Federated Miscellaneous Workers' Union of Australia, he was also active in local politics as a councillor on Broadmeadows Municipal Council. In 1969, he was elected to the Australian House of Representatives as the Labor member for Burke. He held the seat until his retirement in 1980. Johnson died in September 1995.

References

Australian Labor Party members of the Parliament of Australia
Members of the Australian House of Representatives for Burke (1969–2004)
Members of the Australian House of Representatives
1929 births
1995 deaths
20th-century Australian politicians
Politicians from Melbourne